Joshua James Ross (born 9 February 1981) is an indigenous Australian track and field sprinter. He was national 100-metre (100m) champion for several years and competed for Australia at the 2004 and 2012 Summer Olympics. Ross is the fourth fastest Australian of all time with a personal best time of 10.08 seconds achieved on 10 March 2008, after Patrick Johnson (9.93 in 2010), Rohan Browning (10.01 in 2021) and Matt Shirvington (10.03 in 2007).

Early life
Ross was born 9 February 1981 in Sydney. He spent his early childhood in south western Sydney and moved with his family to the Central Coast at around age seven. He went to Woy Woy Public School and Henry Kendall High School.

On the Central Coast, Ross attended Little Athletics and he won his first Australian title at age 10 in the long jump. Apart from the occasional school competition, however, he did not return to athletics until he was nineteen. During that time he played representative rugby league on the Central Coast.

Career
In 2005, he again won the Stawell Gift – this time from the honoured scratch mark time, becoming only the second athlete to achieve this feat (behind Madagascar's Jean-Louis Ravelomanantsoa in 1975) and the first Australian. He also became the third person ever to win the event twice.

He reached the semi finals at the 2004 Summer Olympics and 2005 World Championships. He has won four consecutive Australian national 100-metre titles and became a vital and successful member of Australia's 4 × 100m relay team which placed sixth at the Athens Olympics in 2004. Ross holds the fastest 100m time by an Australian on native soil, his personal best, 10.08 seconds, set in Brisbane on 10 March 2007. He also has a personal best in the 200m of 20.52.

An Indigenous Australian, Ross was awarded the 2004 Deadly Award for Male Sportsperson of the Year.

Ross won his fifth Australian national 100m title in March 2009; and reportedly retired in the same year.

Ross returned to athletics and won his sixth national 100m title in 2012 with a time of 10.23. Ross also threatened to walk out of the Australian 4 × 100m Olympic relay team if he was not allowed to compete in the individual men's 100 metres at the Olympic Games. Ross's most successful year has been 2007 when he ran his personal best of 10.08 then 10.10 then 10.12 and then 10.13. He was a member of the Australian 4 × 100m relay team that equalled the Australian record when they qualified for the finals at the 2012 London Olympics. Ross and John Steffensen held a press conference in the week before the games began, criticising their selection in only the relay event and not the individual races.

Ross gained the sprint double at the 2013 Victorian Championships when he won the men's open 100-metre and 200-metre finals at Lakeside Stadium, Albert Park. In 2013 Ross won his seventh national title in a time of 10.34 seconds, equalling the record of Hec Hogan.

In late 2013 Athletics Australia served Ross with an infringement notice for failing to appear for mandatory Australian Sports Anti-Doping Authority drug tests on three occasions over an 18-month period. Following an appeal to the Court of Arbitration for Sport, Ross was suspended for 12 months, which ruled him out of the 2014 Commonwealth Games.

In 2018 it was reported that Ross, who lives in the Hunter region, will compete in the 2018 Stawell Gift.

He is recognized in the Australian Olympic Committee list of Australian Indigenous Olympians.

References

External links
 Profile at London2012.com
 Profile at Australian Olympic Team
 
 
 

1981 births
Living people
Australian male sprinters
Athletes (track and field) at the 2004 Summer Olympics
Athletes (track and field) at the 2012 Summer Olympics
Olympic athletes of Australia
Stawell Gift winners
Athletes from Sydney
Indigenous Australian Olympians
Indigenous Australian track and field athletes
World Athletics Championships athletes for Australia
Doping cases in athletics
Doping cases in Australian track and field